The 2017 Súper TC2000 season was the 6th season of this category, founded in 2012 and since that year was categorized as divisional major, compared to its pair TC2000.

Teams and drivers
All drivers were registered in Argentina. Guest drivers for the 200 km de Buenos Aires are not included.

Race calendar and results
All races are scheduled to be held in Argentina.

Championships

Drivers (top 10)

Teams

Manufacturers

References

External links
 

Super TC2000
Super TC2000
TC 2000 Championship seasons